The 1971 Tasmanian Australian National Football League (TANFL) premiership season was an Australian rules football competition staged in Hobart, Tasmania over twenty (20) roster rounds and five (5) finals series matches (one match was drawn) between 3 April and 25 September 1971.

Participating Clubs
Clarence District Football Club
Glenorchy District Football Club
Hobart Football Club
New Norfolk District Football Club
North Hobart Football Club
Sandy Bay Football Club

1971 TANFL Club Coaches
John Bingley (Clarence)
Trevor Sprigg (Glenorchy)
Dennis Munari (Hobart)
Ricky Graham (New Norfolk)
John Devine (North Hobart)
Rod Olsson (Sandy Bay)

TANFL Reserves Grand Final
(Saturday, 18 September 1971)
Sandy Bay 12.16 (88) v New Norfolk 11.5 (71) – North Hobart Oval

TANFL Under-19's Grand Final
New Norfolk 17.13 (115) v Lindisfarne 13.10 (88) – North Hobart Oval

State Preliminary Final
(Saturday, 18 September 1971)
Latrobe 13.13 (91) v Scottsdale 9.14 (68) – Att: 10,543 at York Park

State Grand Final
(Saturday, 2 October 1971)
Sandy Bay: 0.5 (5) | 4.10 (34) | 6.13 (49) | 12.14 (86)
Latrobe:  1.5 (11) | 2.9 (21) | 3.13 (31) | 8.17 (65)
Attendance: 11,329 at North Hobart Oval

Intrastate Matches
Jubilee Shield (Saturday, 1 May 1971)
TANFL 19.12 (126) v NWFU 14.11 (95) – Att: 5,027 at West Park Oval

Jubilee Shield (Saturday, 29 May 1971)
TANFL 19.12 (126) v NTFA 12.7 (79) – Att: 9,579 at North Hobart Oval

Interstate Match
(Monday, 14 June 1971)
South Australia 17.14 (116) v Tasmania 12.12 (84) – Att: 20,548 at North Hobart Oval

Leading Goalkickers: TANFL
Terry Mayne (Clarence) – 74
Ben Nusteling (New Norfolk) – 69
John Guiver (Sandy Bay) – 63
Lance Morton (Sandy Bay) – 62

Medal Winners
Rod Olsson (Sandy Bay) – William Leitch Medal
Les Barrett (New Norfolk) – George Watt Medal (Reserves)
Tim Woodham (New Norfolk) – V.A Geard Medal (Under-19's)
Adrian Bowden (Clarence) – Weller Arnold Medal (Best player in Intrastate matches)

1971 TANFL Ladder

Round 1
(Saturday, 3 April 1971)
New Norfolk 17.17 (119) v Nth Hobart 9.7 (61) – Att: 4,534 at North Hobart Oval
Clarence 12.18 (90) v Glenorchy 12.15 (87) – Att: 3,819 at Bellerive Oval
Sandy Bay 17.16 (118) v Hobart 12.16 (88) – Att: 3,679 at Queenborough Oval

Round 2
(Saturday, 10 April & Monday, 12 April 1971)
Sandy Bay 25.15 (165) v Glenorchy 20.17 (137) – Att: 4,700 at North Hobart Oval
Nth Hobart 16.13 (109) v Hobart 14.24 (108) – Att: 3,043 at TCA Ground
New Norfolk 15.22 (112) v Clarence 12.15 (87) – Att: 6,931 at North Hobart Oval (Monday)

Round 3
(Saturday, 17 April 1971)
Sandy Bay 17.17 (119) v Nth Hobart 11.9 (75) – Att: 5,423 at North Hobart Oval
Hobart 14.20 (104) v Clarence 10.11 (71) – Att: 3,340 at TCA Ground
New Norfolk 15.10 (100) v Glenorchy 12.9 (81) – Att: 2,857 at Boyer Oval

Round 4
(Saturday, 24 April 1971)
New Norfolk 13.24 (102) v Hobart 9.16 (70) – Att: 3,469 at North Hobart Oval
Clarence 25.19 (169) v Sandy Bay 15.14 (104) – Att: 4,781 at Bellerive Oval
Glenorchy 14.17 (101) v Nth Hobart 13.16 (94) – Att: 3,316 at KGV Football Park

Round 5
(Saturday, 1 May 1971)
Nth Hobart 14.19 (103) v Clarence 15.9 (99) – Att: 4,251 at North Hobart Oval
Sandy Bay 16.11 (107) v New Norfolk 12.14 (86) – Att: 2,799 at Queenborough Oval
Glenorchy 12.15 (87) v Hobart 6.10 (46) – Att: 2,971 at KGV Football Park

Round 6
(Saturday, 8 May 1971)
Sandy Bay 13.18 (96) v Hobart 11.19 (85) – Att: 3,602 at North Hobart Oval
Clarence 18.17 (125) v Glenorchy 13.16 (94) – Att: 3,913 at Bellerive Oval
New Norfolk 9.19 (73) v Nth Hobart 10.10 (70) – Att: 2,317 at Boyer Oval

Round 7
(Saturday, 15 May 1971)
Nth Hobart 19.20 (134) v Hobart 16.10 (106) – Att: 3,853 at North Hobart Oval
Clarence 14.19 (103) v New Norfolk 13.10 (88) – Att: 3,475 at Boyer Oval
Glenorchy 19.11 (125) v Sandy Bay 17.10 (112) – Att: 3,580 at KGV Football Park

Round 8
(Saturday, 22 May 1971)
New Norfolk 20.19 (139) v Glenorchy 20.10 (130) – Att: 4,189 at North Hobart Oval
Sandy Bay 20.26 (146) v Nth Hobart 7.14 (56) – Att: 3,383 at Queenborough Oval
Clarence 18.24 (132) v Hobart 14.14 (98) – Att: 3,106 at TCA Ground

Round 9
(Saturday, 5 June 1971)
Clarence 13.12 (90) v Sandy Bay 9.17 (71) – Att: 6,656 at North Hobart Oval
Hobart 16.14 (110) v New Norfolk 13.13 (91) – Att: 1,777 at TCA Ground
Nth Hobart 11.17 (83) v Glenorchy 6.14 (50) – Att: 3,111 at KGV Football Park

Round 10
(Saturday, 12 June 1971)
Glenorchy 16.9 (105) v Hobart 7.18 (60) – Att: 3,544 at North Hobart Oval
New Norfolk 12.11 (83) v Sandy Bay 12.10 (82) – Att: 2,086 at Boyer Oval
Clarence 14.11 (95) v Nth Hobart 11.9 (75) – Att: 3,620 at Bellerive Oval

Round 11
(Saturday, 19 June 1971)
Nth Hobart 19.5 (119) v New Norfolk 17.16 (118) – Att: 3,569 at North Hobart Oval
Sandy Bay 23.28 (166) v Hobart 8.10 (58) – Att: 2,431 at Queenborough Oval
Glenorchy 19.17 (131) v Clarence 13.11 (89) – Att: 3,561 at KGV Football Park

Round 12
(Saturday, 26 June 1971)
New Norfolk 12.3 (75) v Clarence 9.3 (57) – Att: 2,875 at North Hobart Oval
Sandy Bay 9.13 (67) v Glenorchy 8.14 (62) – Att: 2,201 at Queenborough Oval
Hobart 12.13 (85) v Nth Hobart 4.12 (36) – Att: 1,393 at TCA Ground

Round 13
(Saturday, 3 July 1971)
Sandy Bay 11.12 (78) v Nth Hobart 9.8 (62) – Att: 3,970 at North Hobart Oval
New Norfolk 19.11 (125) v Glenorchy 7.15 (57) – Att: 2,110 at Boyer Oval
Clarence 12.11 (83) v Hobart 11.13 (79) – Att: 2,582 at Bellerive Oval

Round 14
(Saturday, 10 July 1971)
Glenorchy 10.8 (68) v Nth Hobart 9.9 (63) – Att: 3,852 at North Hobart Oval
Clarence 15.24 (114) v Sandy Bay 13.13 (91) – Att: 4,555 at Bellerive Oval
New Norfolk 13.16 (94) v Hobart 9.6 (60) – Att: 1,963 at Boyer Oval

Round 15
(Saturday, 17 July 1971)
Clarence 20.9 (129) v Nth Hobart 12.10 (82) – Att: 3,865 at North Hobart Oval
Sandy Bay 20.15 (135) v New Norfolk 14.12 (96) – Att: 3,079 at Queenborough Oval
Glenorchy 18.19 (127) v Hobart 12.9 (81) – Att: 2,242 at KGV Football Park

Round 16
(Saturday, 24 July 1971)
Clarence 20.16 (136) v Glenorchy 12.10 (82) – Att: 5,231 at North Hobart Oval
Hobart 23.21 (159) v Sandy Bay 14.11 (95) – Att: 2,179 at TCA Ground
New Norfolk 21.11 (137) v Nth Hobart 12.9 (81) – Att: 1,903 at Boyer Oval

Round 17
(Saturday, 31 July 1971)
Hobart 14.11 (95) v Nth Hobart 12.12 (84) – Att: 2,624 at North Hobart Oval
Clarence 16.10 (106) v New Norfolk 9.8 (62) – Att: 4,057 at Bellerive Oval
Sandy Bay 17.10 (112) v Glenorchy 16.11 (107) – Att: 2,630 at KGV Football Park

Round 18
(Saturday, 7 August 1971)
Clarence 15.10 (100) v Hobart 11.17 (83) – Att: 3,866 at North Hobart Oval
Glenorchy 13.16 (94) v New Norfolk 9.10 (64) – Att: 3,020 at KGV Football Park
Nth Hobart 14.23 (107) v Sandy Bay 14.13 (97) – Att: 2,801 at Queenborough Oval

Round 19
(Saturday, 14 August 1971)
Nth Hobart 13.21 (99) v Glenorchy 11.8 (74) – Att: 3,367 at North Hobart Oval
Sandy Bay 20.16 (136) v Clarence 6.7 (43) – Att: 4,000 at Queenborough Oval
New Norfolk 15.13 (103) v Hobart 11.12 (78) – Att: 1,741 at TCA Ground

Round 20
(Saturday, 21 August 1971)
New Norfolk 12.15 (87) v Sandy Bay 9.18 (72) – Att: 5,670 at North Hobart Oval
Clarence 18.19 (127) v Nth Hobart 14.10 (94) – Att: 3,928 at Bellerive Oval
Glenorchy 20.20 (140) v Hobart 12.21 (93) – Att: 1,809 at TCA Ground

First Semi Final
(Saturday, 28 August 1971)
Sandy Bay: 6.8 (44) | 10.16 (76) | 11.21 (87) | 15.28 (118)
Glenorchy: 4.4 (28) | 9.9 (63) | 14.12 (96) | 16.13 (109)
Attendance: 10,265 at North Hobart Oval

Second Semi Final
(Saturday, 4 September 1971)
Clarence: 4.2 (26) | 8.3 (51) | 14.6 (90) | 18.9 (117)
New Norfolk: 5.2 (32) | 12.4 (76) | 13.6 (84) | 17.12 (114)
Attendance: 12,777 at North Hobart Oval

Preliminary Final
(Saturday, 11 September 1971)
Sandy Bay: 8.4 (52) | 11.4 (70) | 15.7 (97) | 15.8 (98)
New Norfolk: 2.1 (13) | 4.9 (33) | 9.14 (68) | 13.20 (98)
Attendance: 8,857 at North Hobart Oval

Preliminary Final Replay
(Saturday, 18 September 1971)
Sandy Bay: 4.4 (28) | 9.5 (59) | 13.10 (88) | 18.14 (122)
New Norfolk: 5.3 (33) | 9.9 (63) | 11.11 (77) | 16.16 (112)
Attendance: 13,765 at North Hobart Oval

Grand Final
(Saturday, 25 September 1971)
Sandy Bay: 7.4 (46) | 13.9 (87) | 17.11 (113) | 18.13 (121)
Clarence: 4.1 (25) | 7.4 (46) | 10.11 (71) | 16.16 (112)
Attendance: 20,364 at North Hobart Oval

Source: All scores and statistics courtesy of the Hobart Mercury and Saturday Evening Mercury (SEM) publications.

Tasmanian Football League seasons